Bar Refaeli (born ) is an Israeli model, television host, businesswoman and actress. She is among the most internationally successful models to come from Israel, appearing on the cover of the 2009 Sports Illustrated Swimsuit Issue, and being voted No. 1 on Maxim magazine's Hot 100 list of 2012. As a television host, Refaeli has hosted The X Factor Israel since 2013 and co-hosted the Eurovision Song Contest 2019 in Tel Aviv.

As a result of her modeling and investment careers, her net worth was estimated at US$20 million in 2015. She was the highest-paid model in Israel according to Forbes Israel in 2013.

Early life

Refaeli was born and raised in Hod HaSharon, Israel, to a secular Jewish family. In Hebrew, her first name means "wild" (as in wilderness), and her surname literally means "my God heals" and is a derivative of the biblical angel Raphael. Her parents were both born in Israel, and her grandparents were Jewish immigrants from Italy, Lithuania and Poland. Her grandparents were Holocaust survivors. Her father Refael "Rafi" Refaeli is a former horse stable owner, and her mother was a model in the 1970s under her maiden name Tzipora "Tzipi" Levine. Bar's younger brothers are Dor Refaeli and On Refaeli. She also has an older half-brother, Neil Ben-Porat, from her mother's first marriage to Israeli businessman Yehousha "Shuki" Ben-Porat.

Career

Modeling
Refaeli began modeling at the age of eight months, when she first appeared in commercials. Orthodonture at 12 interrupted her modeling until she was 15, when an Israeli fashion awards ceremony awarded Refaeli "Model of the Year" (2000). She played prominently in campaigns for the fashion brands Castro and Pilpel, and she starred in a Milky pudding commercial.

She has appeared in editorials for French, American, Italian, Spanish, Russian, and Ukrainian Elle, Spanish Vogue, British, Russian, Australian, and Vietnamese Harper's Bazaar, V, French and Dutch L'Officiel, American, British, Italian, German, Spanish, and Indian GQ, i-D, and Allure.
She has appeared on the covers of French, Italian, Spanish, Dutch, Russian, Belgian, Danish, Swedish, Australian, Latvian, Norwegian, Polish, Bulgarian, Romanian, Slovenian, Croatian, and Turkish Elle, French, Spanish, and Russian Marie Claire, British, Italian, Spanish, German, Portuguese, and Mexican GQ, American, British, Australian, and Serbian Maxim, and Esquire.

Refaeli has appeared in advertising campaigns for Chanel, Escada, Ralph Lauren, Desigual, Andrew Marc, Victoria's Secret, Marks and Spencer, Gap, Moët & Chandon, Hurley, Rampage, True Religion, Lucky Brand, Accessorize, Passionata, Fox, Reebok, Sears, Arrow, Besni, Marco Bicego, and Agua Bendita. She also has appeared in advertising-campaigns for non-fashion brands such as Garnier Fructis, Samsung, and Subaru.

Refaeli became the second Israeli model to appear in Sports Illustrated magazine (after Michaela Bercu), in her 2007 debut in its Swimsuit Issue, where she posed with the rock band Aerosmith. Refaeli was the cover-model for the 2009 Sports Illustrated Swimsuit Issue. Southwest Airlines painted a bikini-clad Refaeli from that shoot on the side of its Boeing 737, which led some passengers to criticize the airline for what they regarded as prurient, and hence "offensive to families."

Refaeli has modeled for Subaru, Accessorize, Brazilian clothing line Besni, Italian jewelry line Marco Bicego, and Rampage. In 2009, she modeled for Garnier International.

On 5 March 2009, Refaeli received the World Style Award presented by the Women's World Awards for her "natural elegance, sense of style, and compassion." In October of the same year, Refaeli co-hosted Fashionable Istanbul's press conference, announced its October 2009 fashion event, and appeared in its advèrtisements. FHM voted Refaeli No. 42 in 2008, No. 57 in 2010, and No. 97 in 2011, in its lists of the "100 Sexiest Women."

Maxim placed Refaeli at the very top of its Hot 100 list in 2012. In April 2012, Shalom Life ranked her fourth on its list of the "50 most talented, intelligent, funny, and gorgeous Jewish women in the world."

According to Forbes Israel, in 2013 she was the highest-paid model in Israel, ahead of the combined modelling income of such other Israeli models as Esti Ginzburg, Gal Gadot, and Shlomit Malka.

In 2013 she also received a Vienna Fashion Award in the category of "Style-Icon".

As of March 2017, Refaeli was the second most influential person on Israeli Instagram, according to the Israeli Internet Association, behind Anna Zak, but ahead of Neta Alchimister.

Film, television, and stage
Refaeli co-starred in the Israeli TV drama series Pick Up in 2005. In October 2008, she co-hosted the Bravo special program Tommy Hilfiger Presents Ironic Iconic America, based on the book Ironic Iconic America written by George Lois. She returned as a program host in 2009, this time for MTV's brief revival of House of Style.

In 2009, she was also a guest-judge at Project Runway Israel.

In 2011, Refaeli starred in the American-Israeli film Session, directed by Haim Bouzaglo. The film is a psychological thriller that tells the story of a manipulative psychiatrist who becomes obsessed with a new young patient. She also served as a guest judge on cycle four of Germany's Next Topmodel hosted by Heidi Klum. In November 2012 she started her own model casting show Million Dollar Shootingstar on German TV Channel Sat.1.

In late 2012, she played the titular role in Cinderella, a musical adaptation staged for Channukkah in Israel.

In January 2013, Refaeli appeared in Go Daddy's Super Bowl XLVII commercial. In 2013, Refaeli also hosted the first season of The X Factor Israel, which became the most popular music show in Israel, leading to them bringing her back in 2015 for season two. In 2018 Refaeli appeared in a music video of X Factor judge, Ivri Lider. In 2013, Refaeli played a starring role in the French-Israeli crime-caper film Kidon, a comedy in which she stars as a Mossad assassin involved in liquidating a terrorist.

Assi Azar reportedly wrote the hit Israeli TV series, Beauty and the Baker with Refaeli in mind for the lead role. Rotem Sela eventually played the role that Refaeli reportedly turned down.

Refaeli hosted the main event of the Eurovision Song Contest 2019 in Tel Aviv alongside Erez Tal, whereas Assi Azar and Lucy Ayoub hosted the Green Room (Artists' backstage).

Business and investment

Refaeli has an ownership stake in a number of fashion companies, such as in the designer glasses manufacturer Carolina Lemke. In September 2018 it was announced that Kim Kardashian would be the face of the brand alongside Refaeli, with the two appearing in a promotional campaign together.

On the sale of a 5% stake to fashion brand Castro in 2016, Refaeli made a NIS 2-4 million profit.

In 2011, Refaeli and Dudi Balsar, an attorney and former male model, set up an E-commerce company called Under.me, to sell designer underwear. As well as being its investor, Refaeli runs business development for the venture. By November 2011, the company had raised $1 million in venture capital funds.

In 2013, her startup 'Mika Look', which is an iPad app that allows users to purchase the items that models are wearing, raised $1.2 million in its first financing round.

Refaeli is one of the main investors behind MyCheck, which processes payments behind smart phones, and which raised $1.7 million in its first financing round. In its second financing round, it raised $4.2 million.

In 2016, Refaeli lodged a police complaint for identity theft with the Israel Police after a news item in Calcalist linked her to suspicious money transfers involving Amir Bramly, based on leaked banking correspondence. Bramly sued the Calcalist reporter in relation to the media coverage.

Tax-evasion
In late 2015, Refaeli was accused of concealing millions of shekels of annual income, despite an estimated net worth of US$20 million in 2015. It was revealed she had recently bought a NIS 15 million apartment in Tel Aviv, as well as a NIS 2.5 million apartment for her younger brother. On 16 December 2015, Israeli tax authorities in Tel Aviv detained her and her mother overnight for questioning related to potential tax evasion; she was accused of failing to pay income tax on two vehicles that she received as compensation for posing in pictures with the vehicles, and for evading taxes by disguising her Israeli residency by renting a luxury apartment in Tel Aviv through relatives.

On 3 January 2019, it was announced that Refaeli was suspected of tax-evasion and was facing a possible indictment along with her parents. On 22 April 2019, her appeal was rejected and she was ordered to pay taxes on concealed income of $4.5 million which, according to a report in Haaretz, could amount to "tens of millions of shekels".

In June 2020, as a result of a plea deal on tax-evasion charges, Refaeli was sentenced to 9 months community service, ordered to pay a fine of $720,000, as well as repaying back taxes of $2.3 million. Her mother was jailed for 16 months and also fined.

Activism and charity
Refaeli participated in a campaign to help reduce the use of plastic bags in Israel. In 2009, she led an unpaid campaign on behalf of the Israel Water Authority, to educate the public about water use and conservation.

On 7 June 2013, Refaeli hosted a beach party in Tel Aviv for participants of Tel Aviv Pride, the city's gay pride parade. In November 2013, she spoke out in support of legislation for civil marriages in Israel, as part of a campaign for the proposed Knesset bill.

Refaeli hosted the closing ceremony for the 2017 Maccabiah Games in Latrun, Israel, on 18 July 2017.

Avoidance of military service
As early as 2004, Refaeli received criticism in her country for avoiding its mandatory service in the army. At the time, fellow Israeli model Agam Rudberg said: "The way Bar Refaeli evaded army-service wasn't right. It's worth trying to serve in the army, and only if you don't feel good there to try to do something."

In 2007, the YnetNews reported that Refaeli had evaded the draft by marrying family-acquaintance Arik Weinstein in 2003, and divorcing him soon afterwards. Military service in the Israel Defense Forces (IDF) is mandatory in Israel for unmarried secular Jewish women over the age of 18.

The Israeli Forum for the Promotion of Equal Share in the Burden threatened to boycott the Israeli fashion chain Fox if they hired her. The two sides reached a compromise in which Refaeli agreed to visit injured IDF soldiers whenever she was in Israel, and actively encourage army enlistment. Refaeli later said, "I don't regret not enlisting, because it paid off big time. That's just the way it is: celebrities have other needs. I hope my case has influenced the army." She also said: "Israel or Uganda, what difference does it make? It makes no difference to me. Why is it good to die for our country? What, isn't it better to live in New York? Why should 18-year-old kids have to die? It's dumb that people have to die so that I can live in Israel."

In 2009, while speaking in support of enlisting, fellow Israeli model Esti Ginzburg also criticized Refaeli for evading military-service. Two years later, Refaeli was featured on the cover of Italian GQs war-themed May 2011 issue. Refaeli's avoidance of military service was again raised in 2013, this time by IDF Brigadier General Yoav Mordechai, who criticized the Ministry of Foreign Affairs for casting her in a 2013 advertisement. Mordechai maintained that the use of Refaeli as an "official representative of Israel" sent a "negative message" to Israeli society.

In 2014, during Operation Protective Edge, Refaeli frequently expressed solidarity and appreciation of Israeli citizens serving in the Israeli Army with postings on her social network accounts, and by posting selfies of her together with smiling Israeli soldiers.

Personal life
Refaeli has two brothers; On Refaeli is a model and actor, and Dor Refaeli is an entrepreneur.

In November 2005, Refaeli began a relationship with American actor Leonardo DiCaprio after meeting him at a party in Las Vegas for members of U2. In the course of their trip to Israel in March 2007, the couple met Israeli President Shimon Peres and visited her hometown of Hod HaSharon. The relationship ended in June 2009. In 2010, numerous reports indicated that their romance had been rekindled, but in May 2011, it was reported that they had ended their romantic relationship and would remain friends. She married Israeli businessman Adi Ezra on 24 September 2015 in Israel. They have two daughters, born in 2016 and 2017, and a son born in 2020.

Filmography

Film

Television

See also
Israeli fashion

References

External links

 

1985 births
21st-century Israeli actresses
Businesspeople in online retailing
Israeli child models
Draft evaders
Israeli businesspeople in fashion
Israeli women chief executive officers
Israeli female models
Israeli film actresses
Israeli Jews
Israeli philanthropists
Israeli television actresses
Israeli television presenters
21st-century Israeli businesswomen
21st-century Israeli businesspeople
Israeli women television presenters
Jewish female models
Jewish Israeli actresses
Israeli LGBT rights activists
Living people
People from Hod HaSharon